is an extreme trans-Neptunian and scattered disc object from the outermost regions of the Solar System, approximately 134 kilometers in diameter.

Description 

 was first observed on 22 September 2014, by astronomers at the Cerro Tololo Observatory near La Serena, Chile.

It orbits the Sun at a distance of 45.4–241.5 AU once every 1718 years and 7 months (627,720 days). Its orbit has an eccentricity of 0.68 and an inclination of 48° with respect to the ecliptic.

Based on an absolute magnitude of approximately 7.6 and an assumed albedo of 0.09, the Johnston's Archive calculated a mean-diameter of 134 kilometers.

See also 
 
 Planets beyond Neptune

References

External links 
 List Of Centaurs and Scattered-Disk Objects, Minor Planet Center
 List of known Trans-Neptunian Objects, Johnston's Archive
 
 

Minor planet object articles (unnumbered)
20140922